Denzel Robert Valentine (born November 16, 1993) is an American professional basketball player for the Maine Celtics of the NBA G League. He played college basketball for the Michigan State Spartans. As a senior, Valentine became the first player in Michigan State history to be recognized as the National Player of the Year by the Associated Press. He also earned other player of the year awards from the NABC, USA Today, Sports Illustrated, NBC Sports, and Basketball Times in addition to being named a unanimous First-Team All-American. Valentine was selected with the 14th pick in the 2016 NBA Draft by the Chicago Bulls.

High school career
Valentine attended J. W. Sexton High School, where he was coached by his father, Carlton Valentine (former Michigan State player), and played alongside future Michigan State teammate Bryn Forbes and Iowa basketball player Anthony Clemmons.

As a sophomore, Valentine averaged 10.9 points, 5.8 assists and 6.3 rebounds, leading Sexton to a state title game. He was awarded 2010 Class B honorable mention all-state.

Valentine averaged 14 points, 11 rebounds and nine assists per game as a senior, leading Sexton to a 27–1 record. He was selected as the Lansing State Journal Player of the Year and Associated Press Class B Player of the Year as a senior. As a recruit, Valentine was nationally ranked in the top 100 by Rivals.com (no. 81), ESPNU100 (no. 98), and Scout.com (no. 27).

College career
Following his successful freshman year, Valentine was the recipient of MSU's Unsung Player Award (voted on by players). As a sophomore, he earned honorable-mention All-Big Ten (Coaches and Media).

With Adreian Payne and Gary Harris leaving MSU for the NBA Draft, Keith Appling leaving due to graduation (eventually to the NBA), the dismissal of Kenny Kaminski, and the transfer of Russell Byrd, Valentine saw an increase in leadership and an expanded role on the team as a junior. Before the season started, he was awarded one of the three captain spots. Perhaps one of Valentine's most memorable moments came on Valentine's Day 2015, he hit the game winning shot in a matchup versus Ohio State and finished with 17 points. His junior season saw him earn Orlando Classic All-Tournament Team (averaging 19.3 points and 5.0 rebounds in three games), Third Team All-Big Ten, USBWA All-District V, and NCAA East Regional All-Tournament Team honors.

On November 17, 2015, the senior Valentine became the 4th player in Michigan State history to record a triple-double. He had 29 points, 12 rebounds and 12 assists in Michigan State's 79-73 victory over the fourth-ranked Kansas Jayhawks. It was the first triple-double of the 2015–16 NCAA Division I men's basketball season. On December 21, it was announced that Valentine would be sidelined for 2–3 weeks after he underwent an arthroscopic knee surgery. He returned on January 10, 2016.

He was named to the 35-man midseason watchlist for the Naismith Trophy on February 11. On February 29, he was named a semifinalist of the Oscar Robertson Trophy. Valentine was also a finalist for the John R. Wooden Award, the Adolph Rupp Trophy, Associated Press College Basketball Player of the Year, and the NABC Player of the Year.

Valentine finished the 2015–16 regular season averaging 19.5 points, 7.5 rebounds, and 7.5 assists as MSU finished in second place in the Big Ten. On March 8, USA Today named Valentine National Player of the Year over Oklahoma's Buddy Hield. The Big Ten also announced that Valentine was the Big Ten's Player of the Year. On March 9, Valentine was named to the Sporting News All-American Team.

Valentine's senior year at Michigan State saw him ranked among the NCAA leaders when it came to three-point shooting. He accumulated many awards and won Michigan State's first College Basketball Player of the Year Award since Draymond Green won the NABC Player of the Year in 2012. Valentine shined during the Big Ten tournament in Indianapolis, earning tournament Most Outstanding Player while winning Michigan State's fifth championship. Valentine, along with Bryn Forbes, were selected to the NCAA College Basketball Three-Point Contest following his senior year. Valentine defeated his teammate in the first round of the competition when he rattled off 22 points compared to Forbes' 10. Valentine was eliminated from the competition in the semifinals when he hit 17 points, needing 23 to advance. Valentine's senior year also proved very effective in raising his draft stock. Valentine went from being potentially undrafted to being seen as a potential lottery pick in the 2016 NBA draft.

Awards

University awards
 George Alderton Male Athlete of the Year (Michigan State University Athlete of the Year)

National Player of the Year awards
Naismith Memorial Basketball Hall of Fame - Julius Erving Small Forward of the Year 
AP – National Player of the Year 
 NABC – National Player of the Year 
 USA Today – National Player of the Year 
 NBC Sports – National Player of the Year
 Sports Illustrated – National Player of the Year
 College Sports Madness – National Player of the Year
 Basketball Times – National Player of the Year
 Senior CLASS Award Winner – Top Senior in the Nation
 CollegeInsider.com – Lute Olson National Player of the Year
 Julius Erving Award – Nations Top Small Forward

All-American awards
 AP – 1st Team All-American
 NABC – 1st Team All-American
 CBS Sports – 1st Team All-American
 USA Today – 1st Team All-American 
 NBC Sports – 1st Team All-American 
 College Sports Madness – 1st Team All-American 
 Bleacher Report – 1st Team All-American 
 ESPN – 1st Team All-American
 USBWA – 1st Team All-American
 Sporting News – 1st Team All-American 
 Sports Illustrated – 1st Team All-American
 Sports On Earth – 1st Team All-American
 Senior CLASS Award – 1st Team All-American 
 TSN – 1st Team All-American 
 VegasInsider.com – 1st Team All-American 
 CollegeInsider.com – Lute Olson All-American

Big Ten/Regional awards
 CBS – Big Ten Player of the Year
 CollegeInsider.com – Big Ten Player of the Year
 AP – Big Ten Player of the Year
 FOX – Big Ten Player of the Year 
 Bleacher Report – Big Ten Player of the Year 
 Big Ten Player of the Year (Media)
 Big Ten Player of the Year (Coaches)
 All-Big Ten 1st Team Media
 All-Big Ten 1st Team Coaches 
 CBS – Big Ten 1st Team 
 Bleacher Report – All Big Ten 1st Team 
 Big Ten tournament Most Outstanding Player 
 Big Ten's All Tournament Team 
 USBWA – District V Player of the Year
 USBWA – District V All 1st Team

Professional career

Chicago Bulls (2016–2021)

On June 23, 2016, Valentine was selected by the Chicago Bulls with the 14th overall pick in the 2016 NBA draft. On July 16, 2016, he signed his rookie scale contract with the Bulls. Two days later, Valentine hit a turnaround jumper as time expired to lift the Bulls to an 84–82 overtime victory over the Minnesota Timberwolves in the Las Vegas Summer League championship game.

On January 2, 2017, Valentine, who had played just four total minutes in the previous seven games, played 18 minutes against the Charlotte Hornets and hit his first three three-pointers, finishing with a then season-high nine points. He exited with an ankle injury in the second half, as the Bulls went on to win 118–111. On January 10, 2017, he posted career highs with 19 points and five three-pointers in a 101–99 loss to the Washington Wizards. On March 18, 2017, Valentine recorded his first career double-double with 11 points and 12 rebounds in a 95–86 win over the Utah Jazz. During his rookie season, Valentine received multiple assignments to the Windy City Bulls, Chicago's D-League affiliate.

On November 26, 2017, Valentine had 14 points and career highs of 13 rebounds and seven assists in a 100–93 loss to the Miami Heat. On January 18, 2018, he scored 19 points against the Houston Rockets. Two days later, he scored a career-high 20 points in a 122–119 double-overtime win over the New York Knicks. On March 17, 2018, he hit eight 3-pointers and scored a career-best 34 points in a 114–109 loss to the Cleveland Cavaliers. On April 4, 2018, Valentine underwent arthroscopic debridement on his left knee, which ruled him out for the rest of the season.

In September 2018, Valentine was diagnosed with a sprained left ankle during the team's training camp and was expected to miss one to two weeks. However, in late October, the Bulls announced he was suffering from a bone bruise, not a sprain, and would miss an additional two weeks. On November 19, after missing the first 17 games of the season, Valentine was diagnosed with ongoing ankle instability. Following a left ankle stabilization procedure on November 27, he was ruled out for the season.

Cleveland Cavaliers (2021–2022)
On September 22, 2021, Valentine signed with the Cleveland Cavaliers.

Utah Jazz (2022)
On January 3, 2022, the Cavs traded Valentine to the New York Knicks as part of a three team deal that also included the Los Angeles Lakers. He was subsequently waived.

On January 10, 2022, Valentine signed a 10-day contract with the Utah Jazz.

Maine Celtics (2022–present)
On January 21, 2022, Valentine was acquired via waivers by the Maine Celtics.

On September 15, 2022, Valentine signed with the Boston Celtics. He was waived on September 30. He subsequently re-joined Maine.

Career statistics

NBA

Regular season

|-
| style="text-align:left;"|
| style="text-align:left;"|Chicago
| 57 || 0 || 17.1 || .354|| .351 || .778 || 2.6 || 1.1 || .5 || .1 || 5.1
|-
| style="text-align:left;"|
| style="text-align:left;"|Chicago
| 77 || 37 || 27.2 || .417 || .386 || .745 || 5.1 || 3.2 || .8 || .1 || 10.2
|-
| style="text-align:left;"|
| style="text-align:left;"|Chicago
| 36 || 5 || 13.6 || .409 || .336 || .750 || 2.1 || 1.2 || .7 || .2 || 6.8
|-
| style="text-align:left;"|
| style="text-align:left;"|Chicago
| 62 || 3 || 16.7 || .373 || .331 || .941 || 3.2 || 1.7 || .5 || .1 || 6.5
|-
| style="text-align:left;"|
| style="text-align:left;"|Cleveland
| 22 || 0 || 9.3 || .371 || .409 ||  || 1.7 || .5 || .3 || .0 || 2.9
|-
| style="text-align:left;"|
| style="text-align:left;"|Utah
| 2 || 0 || 9.0 || .500 || .333 ||  || 2.0 || .0 || .5 || .0 || 2.5
|- class"sortbottom"
| style="text-align:center;" colspan="2"|Career
| 256 || 45 || 18.8 || .394 || .360 || .787 || 3.3 || 1.8 || .6 || .1 || 7.0

Playoffs

|-
| style="text-align:left;"|2017
| style="text-align:left;"|Chicago
| 4 || 0 || 5.5 || .333 || .250 ||  || 2.0 || .5 || .0 || .3 || 1.3
|- class"sortbottom"
| style="text-align:center;" colspan="2"|Career
| 4 || 0 || 5.5 || .333 || .250 ||  || 2.0 || .5 || .0 || .3 || 1.3

College

|-
| style="text-align:left;"|2012–13
| style="text-align:left;"|Michigan State
| 36 || 15 || 20.8 || .445 || .281 || .667 || 4.1 || 2.4 || .8 || .3 || 5.0
|-
| style="text-align:left;"|2013–14 
| style="text-align:left;"|Michigan State
| 38 || 33 || 29.4 || .408 || .377 || .677 || 6.0 || 3.8 || 1.0 || .3 || 8.0
|-
| style="text-align:left;"|2014–15 
| style="text-align:left;"|Michigan State 
| 39 || 39 || 33.2 || .443 || .416 || .826 || 6.3 || 4.3 || .9 || .2 || 14.5
|-
| style="text-align:left;"|2015–16
| style="text-align:left;"|Michigan State
| 31 || 30 || 33.0 || .462 || .444 || .853 || 7.5 || 7.8 || 1.0 || .2 || 19.2
|- class"sortbottom"
| style="text-align:center;" colspan="2"|Career
| 144 || 117 || 29.0 || .442 || .408 || .779 || 5.9 || 4.4 || .9 || .3 || 11.4

National team career
Valentine was a member of USA Basketball's senior men's national team at the 2015 Pan American Games which was held in Toronto, Ontario, Canada. The U.S. team captured the tournament's bronze medal, with a 3–2 record The following year, Valentine joined the USA Basketball Select Team to train against the 2016 Rio Olympic team.

Personal life
Valentine is the son of Carlton and Kathy Valentine. His older brother, Drew, played collegiate basketball for Oakland University, and is now the head coach at Loyola University in Chicago. Valentine considers fellow NBA player and Michigan State alumni Draymond Green "like a big brother".

On April 7, 2016, Valentine and his coach at Michigan State, Tom Izzo, were featured as guests on Dancing With the Stars where they learned from Artem Chigvintsev and Edyta Sliwinska.

Valentine is also a rapper who released his first album in February 2021.

References

External links

 Michigan State Spartans bio

1993 births
Living people
21st-century African-American sportspeople
African-American basketball players
All-American college men's basketball players
American men's basketball players
Basketball players at the 2015 Pan American Games
Basketball players from Michigan
Big Ten Athlete of the Year winners
Chicago Bulls draft picks
Chicago Bulls players
Cleveland Cavaliers players
Maine Celtics players
Medalists at the 2015 Pan American Games
Michigan State Spartans men's basketball players
Pan American Games bronze medalists for the United States
Pan American Games medalists in basketball
Shooting guards
Sportspeople from Lansing, Michigan
United States men's national basketball team players
Utah Jazz players
Windy City Bulls players